National League Park  may refer to:

United States

Baseball parks
National League Park (Cleveland), the name of two different ballparks
National League Park (Philadelphia), commonly known as Baker Bowl

See also
League Park (disambiguation)
American League Park (disambiguation)